La Poem is a South Korean male crossover vocal group, composed of four classically-trained singers Chaehoon You, Kihun Park, Minseong Jeong, and Sunghoon Choi. La Poem was formed in July 2020 via a reality audition TV show Phantom Singer Season 3 (Phantom Singer 3), and has been actively performing in various venues (e.g., concerts, TV shows, music festivals, openings of various awards, the opening ceremony of Korean Series, KBO league).

Formation 
La Poem is a male crossover quartet originated from a TV show Phantom Singer 3, which was aired on a Korean TV network jtbc from April 10 to July 3 in 2020. The TV show auditions male singers who are trained mostly in classical music and musical theaters, and selects three teams of a quartet to compete in the end. Having two rounds of competition, La Poem won by most votes of viewers of the show on July 3, 2020, debuting as a crossover music group. The group's name La Poem came from a combination of the French word "la bohème" and the English word "poem", signifying the group's desire to sing freely poem-like songs that can remain in everyone's heart.

Members 
La Poem is composed of four classically-trained singers: two tenors, Chaehoon You and Kihun Park; one baritone, Minseong Jeong; and one countertenor, Sunghoon Choi. The two tenors have different vocal types as Chaehoon is considered a leggero tenor and Kihun a spinto tenor. The fact that the countertenor Sunghoon's vocal range is equivalent to that of a female singer adds unique flavors to their singing compared to typical male vocal quartets.

Each member studied vocal music in high school and university, sharing similar training backgrounds. The classical backgrounds of the members provide them with extended opportunities to perform operatic songs as well as pop music.

Chaehoon You 
Chaehoon went to Hanyang University in Seoul, Korea, following Pohang High School of Arts located in his hometown Pohang, Korea. He was one of top students at the entry of the university. Yet, he tried hard to make his way out to popular music markets rather than classical music theaters. After graduating from the university, he continued to sing on many stages and joined popera groups Awesome and Ekklesia, but did not make any noticeable marks in the market. Chaehoon You's celebrity status, albeit quite limited, finally took off after he sang Il Mondo at his first appearance on the TV show Phantom Singer 3. He has gained a lot of ardent supporters and fans since then.

On August 13, 2021, Culture Concert Nanjang announced that Chaehoon You would be its 9th host. Culture Concert Nanjang, organized by Gwangju MBC, is a music show in which talented singers are invited to perform live. La Poem made their album Scene#1 debut through a Nanjang concert.

Kihun Park 
Kihun went to Seoul National University in Seoul, Korea, following Busan High School of Arts located in his hometown Busan, Korea. He graduated from the university as one of top students. He won many awards from many competitions domestically and internationally while being a university student. In particular, he was awarded Deuxieme Grand Prix (i.e., a runner-up) at the 51st International Singing Competition of Toulouse held in 2016. At that time, he was only 21 years of age. Kihun Park is the youngest member of La Poem and introduces himself as a bulgot (meaning "flame") tenor as his fiery vocal power signifies.

Minseong Jeong 
Minseong went to Yonsei University in Seoul, Korea, following Incheon High School of Arts in Incheon, Korea. He also won many awards from many domestic singing competitions (e.g., the grand prize at Deagu singing competition in 2019). At the time of preliminary auditions of Phantom Singer 3, he had just started more advanced singing training in Folkwang University of the Arts in Germany. As the audition took place in Germany, he went for it and was selected as one of thirty-six competitors. He initially wanted to take a leave of absence while participating in the show recorded in Korea. As the school did not allow it, he decided to drop and returned to Korea to compete.

Sunghoon Choi 
Sunghoon went to Korea National University of Arts in Seoul, Korea, following Gyeongbuk High School of Arts located in his hometown Daegu, Korea. Moving to France, he continued his singing study at City Conservatory of Paris for two years and at Centre of Baroque Music Versailles thereafter. He then moved to Switzerland and earned a master's degree at Geneva University of Music. In living in Europe, Sunghoon Choi participated in many competitions, some of which awarded him grand prizes (e.g., Prix D'honneur from Leopold Bellan International Competition in 2015). He also performed on many stages as a soloist and an opera singer until his audition for Phantom Singer 3 held in London was successful and had to return to Korea to compete with the 36 competitors.

Discography

Extended plays

Singles

Singles (cover versions)

Filmography

Reality TV show

Concerts and Tours

Phantom Singer 3 Gala Concert Tour (August - November, 2020) 
Three quartets that had made it to the final competitions of the show Phantom Singer 3 had a concert tour together after the show was over. Three quartets including La Poem performed the songs that were sung by the singers during the TV show, with some new songs added to the list.

Love Poem Concert (November 18, 2020) 
A classical vocal concert was held with Bass Sonn, Hey-Soo in Seoul Arts Center, Soeul.

Phantom Singer All Stars Gala Concerto Concerts (May 28 - June 6, 2021) 
Nine quartets formed via Phantom Singer 1-3 got together and had a series of concerts in Olympic Hall, Seoul Olympic Park to continue the momentum of the TV show Phantom Singer All Stars. Due to time and space limits, three of the 9 quartets performed together on the same stage. La Poem performed on three different dates, and its detailed timetable is shown below.

La Poem's 1st Concert <Scene#1> Tour (April 10 - August 15, 2021) 
This is La Poem's first concert tour after its formation in July, 2020. The tour was initially scheduled to begin in Seoul on March 27–28, 2021, but it was cancelled due to COVID-19 related social distancing measures. For this reason, La Poem's first concert was held in Busan (KBS Busan Hall) on April 10 and 11. Following the concert, the tour stopped for a while. As June began, concert venues were successively announced, the tour resuming in Ulsan, continuing in Suwon, Cheongju, Seongnam, Daegu, and finishing in Seoul.

2021 Great Concert Series (November 12–13, 2021) 
La Poem was invited to Great Concert Series for year 2021 hosted by Sejong Center. The concert was held in two consecutive days in Sejong Grand Theater in Sejong Center, Seoul, Korea. La Poem sang to the instrumental accompaniment of Korea Coop Orchestra (conducted by Kwang Hyun Kim and played by 53 artists) and a session band, which was organized by Dreamus Company.

Serenade of La Poem (December 25, 2021) 
La Poem had duet concerts from December 21 to 24; Chaehoon performed with Minseong on the 21st and 23rd and Sunghoon with Kihun on 22nd and 24th in CJ Towol Theater, Seoul Arts Center, Seoul. Following these concerts, La Poem held a special event titled Serenade of La Poem combining a concert with a fan meeting in the same place on the 25th, which was hosted by Dreamus Company and CJ E&M; and organized by Moss Music.

References 

Crossover (music)
Vocal quartets
South Korean musical groups